Slapshot is an American hardcore punk band from Boston, Massachusetts.  The band has been active for over 30 years, releasing eight studio albums and a number of singles and EPs over that time period.  Though there have been constant line-up changes, founding member Jack "Choke" Kelly has remained a constant member of the band and its primary vocalist and leader.

History
Slapshot was formed in 1985 by Steve Risteen and Mark McKay, formerly of Terminally Ill; Jack "Choke" Kelly, formerly of Negative FX and Last Rights and Jonathan Anastas, formerly of Decadence and DYS. Due to the reputations of its members, the band had a relatively high profile even before its debut. The zine writer Mike Gitter (who was also an A&R executive) wrote "Slapshot is a great live act", before they had ever played in public.

Diverging from their counterparts in the Boston hardcore scene, Slapshot decided to make the first album a 24-track recording as opposed to the usual 8 or 16-track hardcore album. To reduce costs, they recorded at night and completed the album in four sessions. Back On The Map was released by Taang! Records in 1986.

The band's lineup underwent a number of changes in its first few years, although its sound remained consistent. Jordan Wood, formerly of S.T.P. and later of Deathwish, joined as an additional guitarist, but took over bass guitar when Anastas left the band to continue his education. This line up was featured on their sophomore release, Step On It (Taang! Records). In July 1988, Jamie Sciarappa, former bass player of SS Decontrol, joined the band and Jordan returned to his original slot as a second guitar player. This five-piece lineup recorded the third record, Sudden Death Overtime (Taang! Records).

As the band got ready to record the next record there was a significant line-up change. Jordan left the band returning Slapshot to a single guitar band and Jamie was replaced with Mark and Steve's longtime friend Chris Lauria. Soon after, the band decided to fire Steve Risteen due to what they felt was a lack of guitar skill. It was a very difficult time for the band that is well documented in the Slapshot documentary "Chip On My Shoulder: The Cautionary Tale of Slapshot". Mark McKay eventually also quit (and disconnected himself from the group personally as well) due to multiple issues including a lack of interest in the new material the band was writing.

Their 1993 album Blast Furnace (We Bite Records) was a move into sample-based industrial/metal/hardcore and only included one original member, Choke, along with a more metal-based backing band including Darryl Sheppard of Slaughter Shack, Barry Hite and Chris Lauria. Slapshot toured Europe that spring, and on the second date of the tour, they recorded a live album in Berlin called Live at SO36 (We Bite Records).

The following year there was another line-up change that resulted in Darryl leaving the band to be replaced by Mike Bowser. They recorded the Unconsciousness LP (We Bite Records) in Chicago with Steve Albini, ex-member of Big Black and producer for Nirvana.

In August 1994 Slapshot went off to Europe for a two-month tour with Ignite and a split 7-inch single record was released to promote it. The tour kicked off at the Hultsfred Festival in Sweden on August 11 and ended on October 4 in Germany. Slapshot played 50 shows in 7 countries in 54 days.

Around the time Unconsciousness was being recorded, ex-guitar and bass player Jordan Wood committed suicide. This brought Mark McKay back into the group socially and ultimately back into the band.

With its most solid line-up in years Slapshot returned to the studio to record their album, "16 Valve Hate" (Lost & Found Records/Taang! Records) released in 1995. Less than a year later – with the same line-up – the band released "Olde Tyme Hardcore" (Taang! Records, 1996). This album was a return to a more "old-school" hardcore sound and featured a cover of the SSD track "Get It Away".

In July 1997, Slapshot played what was to be their last concert in the United States for five years, in Plymouth, Massachusetts. They toured Europe in 1999, including a stop at the Graspop Metal Meeting in Belgium. In December 1999, a Slapshot tribute album called Boston Drops the Gloves: A Tribute to Slapshot was released by Flat Records (the label owned by Ken Casey of the Dropkick Murphys) and San Francisco-based TKO Records. The album included covers by 22 Boston bands.

In 2001, Slapshot issued a new album entitled Greatest Hits, Slashes and Crosschecks (King Fisher/Century Media) featuring re-recorded and re-mastered versions of classic Slapshot songs, which featured the only recordings of the band with David Link on bass and was the last recorded material with Mike Bowser on guitar.

In 2002 Slapshot played a 15-minute surprise set at The Hideaway in Cambridge, MA as part of a bill alongside Poison Idea, Kill Your Idols, Thumbs Up! and more. The overall reaction to the short set resulted in a full show being booked at The Hideaway for October 13, 2002. However, the club was forced to close just days before the show was scheduled to happen. On October 26, 2002, Slapshot was finally able to play a full set in the US for the first time in over 5 years. The show was the "6th annual Back to School Jam" in Framingham, MA and also featured Blood for Blood, Converge, Reach The Sky, Panic, No Warning, Some Kind of Hate and a rare set by Stars & Stripes.

Around this time Mike Bowser decided to move to New York for a new job and after a guitar search that ended with Ed Lalli (currently singing for The Welch Boys) they returned to the studio for 2003's Digital Warfare (I Scream Records) followed by 2005's Tear It Down (Thorp Records), along with several more European tours.

In 2006, Slapshot released a statement on their website announcing that the band was defunct. However, on June 30, 2007, they played at the Significant Fest 2007 in Clearwater, Florida. Also on the bill were Killing Time, 108 and Uppercut. In July 2008, they played a couple of dates in Europe, with a stop at the With Full Force festival in Germany. These were to be the last shows featuring Ed Lalli on guitar.

Slapshot played a show at Anchors Up in Haverhill, Massachusetts on November 8, 2008, with Ten Yard Fight, Step Forward, and Word For Word. This show was a warm up for the 2008 Winter Tour with Energy and All For Nothing, which brought the return of longtime guitarist Mike Bowser and reformed the classic Olde Tyme Hardcore/16 Vale Hate line-up.

Upon returning from the tour Slapshot played as part of the "2008 Hometown Throwdown" in Boston on December 28 at the Middle East with The Mighty Mighty Bosstones. Choke joined the Bosstones on stage during their cover of the Slapshot song "What's at Stake".

April 24, 2009, finally brought the world premiere of the long awaited Slapshot documentary film "Chip On My Shoulder: The Cautionary Tale of Slapshot". It premiered at the Brattle Theatre in Cambridge, MA to a sold out audience as part of the Boston Independent Film Festival. Following its premiere the film was screened as part of a hardcore festival in Toronto Canada which also featured performances by Negative Approach and Supertouch. The film was also screened at the Salt Lake City Film Festival in August 2009. The film was directed and produced by Ian McFarland (Blood for Blood) and Anthony "Wrench" Moreschi (Ten Yard Fight) of Killswitch Productions and will be released on DVD by Taang! Records eventually.

After another line-up change (including Chris Lauria moving from bass to guitar) Slapshot headed back to Europe for 10 shows in August 2009 with the support of Frigate which features Chris Lauria of Slapshot, Linda Bean of Stars & Stripes and John Bean formerly of Bitter. The tour, dubbed the '2009 Replacements Tour', went well but late 2009 still brought about another line up change.

The next line up of Slapshot included founding member Jack 'Choke' Kelly, longtime member Chris Lauria (back on bass guitar), John Bean on drums and Craig Silverman (formerly of Only Living Witness and currently of The Enemy Within and the touring guitar player for Blood for Blood) on guitar. The band spent the first half of 2010 working on new material and hopes to have some new songs recorded before the end of the year. This line-up played the "Gallery East" reunion show in August 2010 after several warm-up shows in Europe.

In 2012, another lineup change brought Nick Charrette in to play bass.  On June 6, 2012, the 3 song EP "I Believe" was released on Taang! Records as the 11th release by Slaphshot on Taang! Ryan Packer joined on bass in late 2012. Benny Grotto joined in November 2014.

February 2015 the band flew to The Netherlands to play a secret one-off show for a Dutch friend's birthday party in a small bar in Goes.

On March 18, 2019, Craig Silverman announced that he was quitting Slapshot via his Instagram page.

Members
Current
Jack "Choke" Kelly – vocals (1985–present)
Ryan Packer – bass (2012–2015, 2018–present)
Corey Konitz – drums (2018–present)
John Rioux – guitar (2022–present)

Former
Steve Risteen – guitar (1985–1992)
Jonathan Anastas – bass (1985–1987)
Mark McKay - drums (1985–1992, 1994–2009)
Jordan Wood - bass (1987–1988), guitar (1986–1987, 1988–1992)
Jamie Sciarappa - bass (1988–1992)
Darryl Sheppard – guitar (1993–1994)
Chris Lauria – bass (1993–2008, 2010–2012, 2016–2018), guitar (2009–2010)
Barry Hite – drums (1993–1994)
Mike Bowser - guitar (1994–2003, 2008–2009, 2016–2017)
Ed Lalli - guitar (2003–2007)
Craig Silverman - guitar (2010–2016, 2018–2019)
John Bean - drums (2010–2016)
Nick Charrette - bass (2012)
Douglas Mackinnon - drums (2016–2018)

Timeline

Discography
 Studio albums
 Step On It (1988, Taang!)
 Sudden Death Overtime (1990, Taang!)
 Blast Furnace (1993, We Bite)
 Unconsciousness (1994, We Bite)
 16 Valve Hate (1995, Lost and Found)
 Digital Warfare (2003, I Scream)
 Slapshot (2014, Olde Tyme, Brass City Boss Sounds)
 Make America Hate Again (2018, Bridge 9)

 EPs and splits
 Back On The Map 12-inch (1986, Taang!)
 Same Mistake / Might Makes Right 7-inch (1988, Taang!)
 Firewalker 7-inch (1990, Taang!)
 Slapshot / Ignite split 7-inch (1994, Lost and Found)
 Olde Tyme Hardcore CD/12" (1996, Century Media)
 The New England Product Session 7-inch (2004, Bridge 9)
 Tear It Down CD/7" (2005, Thorp, Spook City)
 I Believe 7-inch (2012, Taang!)
 Limited Tour Edition 2012 7-inch (2012, S.J.)
 Everything Wants to Kill You 7-inch (2014, Old School Cartel, Brass City Boss Sounds)

 Live albums
 Live at SO36 12-inch/CD (1993, We Bite)
 Live in Germany VHS (1993, We Bite)
 Super Pro Hardcore CD (2005, self-released)

 Compilation albums
 The CD (1989, Taang!)
 Greatest Hits, Slashes And Crosschecks (2001, KINGfisher, Century Media)

See also
Boston hardcore

References

External links
 
 Official MySpace page
 Jonathan Anastas interview 

Musical groups from Boston
Hardcore punk groups from Massachusetts
Straight edge groups